The 1910–11 Hong Kong First Division League season was the third since its establishment.

Overview
Buffs won the championship.

References
RSSSF

1910-11
1910–11 domestic association football leagues
1910 in Hong Kong
1911 in Hong Kong